Iceland's first ambassador to Germany was Vilhjálmur Finsen in 1952. Iceland's current ambassador to Germany is Gunnar Snorri Gunnarsson.

List of ambassadors

See also
Germany–Iceland relations
Foreign relations of Iceland
Ambassadors of Iceland

References
List of Icelandic representatives (Icelandic Foreign Ministry website) 

Main
Germany
Iceland